George M. Karamarkovich (born 1942) is a retired major general in the United States Marine Corps who was commanding general of the 1st Marine Aircraft Wing and Marine Corps Air Station Cherry Point. He is a native of Pennsylvania.

References

1942 births
Living people
United States Marine Corps generals